The 2016 season was the 102nd in Sociedade Esportiva Palmeiras existence. This season Palmeiras participated in the Campeonato Paulista, Copa Libertadores, Copa do Brasil and the Série A.

Players

Squad information 
Players at the end of the season.

 (on loan from Cruzeiro)

 (on loan from Tombense)

 (on loan from Internacional)

 (on loan from Brugge)

Transfers

Transfers in

Transfers out

Competitions

Overview

Friendlies 
On November 27, 2015 was announced that Palmeiras will dispute a friendly tournament in Montevideo, Uruguay between January 20–23.

Campeonato Paulista

Standings 
Palmeiras was drawn in the Group B.

First stage

Quarterfinal

Semifinal

Copa Libertadores 

As a 2015 Copa do Brasil winner, Palmeiras qualified directly to the second stage.

The draw of the tournament was held on December 22, 2015 at the CONMEBOL Convention Centre in Luque, Paraguay.

Standings

Second stage

Campeonato Brasileiro

Standings

Matches

Copa do Brasil 

As a team that disputed the Copa Libertadores, Palmeiras entered in the round of 16.

Round of 16 
The draw for this round was held on August 2, 2016.

Quarterfinal 
The draw for this round was held on September 23, 2016.

Statistics

Overall statistics

Goalscorers 
In italic players who left the team in mid-season.

References

External links 
 Official site 

2016
Palmeiras